The following is a list of international schools in Singapore, including local schools which offer Foreign Educational programmes.

In summary, there are 3 main systems offered by International Schools in Singapore. These are the AP (Advanced Placement) system, more commonly known as the American-based system, the IB (International Baccalaureate) system and the English national system. Other systems or curricula include the Montessori program and various curricula from a variety of nations, with many schools offering a combination.

See also

 List of international schools

References

External links
 Directory of schools in Singapore

 
Singapore
International